Ofarim Concert – Live 1969 is a live album by Esther & Abi Ofarim, recorded during the duo's 1969 European tour and released in the same year by Philips Records.

Track listing

1LP version

2LP version

Charts

References 

1969 live albums
Esther & Abi Ofarim albums
Philips Records live albums
Albums produced by Abi Ofarim